Macaranga paxii is a species of plant in the family Euphorbiaceae. It is found in Cameroon and Nigeria. It is threatened by habitat loss.

References

paxii
Vulnerable plants
Taxonomy articles created by Polbot